Koleyn Rural District is in Fashapuyeh District of Ray County, Tehran province, Iran. At the National Census of 2006, its population was 3,859 in 942 households. There were 5,543 inhabitants in 1,434 households at the following census of 2011. At the most recent census of 2016, the population of the rural district was 8,943 in 1,459 households. The largest of its 22 villages was Ebrahimabad, with 3,530 people.

References 

Ray County, Iran

Rural Districts of Tehran Province

Populated places in Tehran Province

Populated places in Ray County, Iran